World junior heavyweight championship may refer to:

World Junior Heavyweight Championship (AJPW)
World Junior Heavyweight Championship (National Wrestling Association)
CZW World Junior Heavyweight Championship
Independent Junior Heavyweight Championship
IWA World Junior Heavyweight Championship
NWA World Junior Heavyweight Championship
NWA World Junior Heavyweight Championship (Zero1)
UWA World Junior Heavyweight Championship
WWC World Junior Heavyweight Championship